John Stanyan Bigg (1828–1865) was an English poet of the  Spasmodic School.
 
His major works are The Sea-King; A metrical romance, in six cantos (1848), Night and the soul. A dramatic poem (1854), Shifting Scenes and Other Poems (1862).

In 1858 Stanyan Bigg submitted an entry to the 'Burns Centenary Poetry Competition', organised by the directors of the Crystal Palace Company in London to mark the centenary of the birth of Robert Burns.

References

External links

His poem - placed 7th out of over 600 entries - together with details of the Competition can be found at 

1828 births
1865 deaths
English male poets
19th-century English poets
19th-century English male writers